The Biblioteca Garneriana, is a public library, founded by the mid-15th century, and located in two buildings along via Roma, in San Daniele, region of Friuli, Italy.

History
The library was initially founded by 1445 around the posthumous donation of 173 manuscripts by the vicar of Aquileia, Guarnerio d’Artegna. Some donations increased the collection over the centuries, but not until 1736 when Giusto Fontanini endowed the library with his large collection of manuscripts and over 2000 books, did the local council decide to build a new home for the collection, including a decorative shelves of oak. Presently the antique collections of the library, adjacent to the town's cathedral, include 600 codices, 80 incunabula, and 700 books from the 16th century. A separate building, across Via Roma, holds the modern collections.

References

Libraries in Italy
1445 establishments in Europe
Libraries established in the 15th century